Edmond Nathan Yafil (1874 – October 1928) was an Algerian composer.

Biography
Native Jew born in Algiers in 1874, Yafil began, as all the musicians of his time, by attending the Moorish cafés of the old Casbah Algiers places where perpetuated the tradition of Çan'a music, also referred to as Andalusian classical music.

He will collaborate with Jules Rouanet on the cataloging of Çan'a music and in theater with Mahieddine Bachtarzi and Ali Sellali.
He is buried at the St. Eugene Cemetery.

Bibliography
 Répertoire de musique arabe et maure : collection de mélodies, ouvertures, noubet, chansons, préludes, etc. / recueillie par Edmond-Nathan Yafil, sous la direction de Jules Rouanet.

References

External links
Biography

Christopher Silver, Recording History: Jews, Muslims, and Music across Twentieth-Century North Africa (Stanford University Press, 2022).

1874 births
1928 deaths
Jewish musicologists
Algerian songwriters
Algerian composers
People from Casbah
Algerian Jews
19th-century musicologists
People of French Algeria